"Fix" is a song recorded by American country music singer Chris Lane for his 2015 extended play of the same name. It was released to digital retailers by Big Loud Records on October 30, 2015 as the record's lead single. It is also included on his second studio album, Girl Problems, which was released on August 5, 2016. The song was written by Sarah Buxton, Jesse Frasure, and Abe Stoklasa and produced by Joey Moi.

"Fix" peaked at number one on the Billboard Country Airplay chart, giving Lane his first number-one hit overall. It also charted at numbers 10 and 65 on both the Hot Country Songs and Hot 100 charts respectively. It also charted in Canada, peaking at number 8 on the Canada Country chart and number 100 on the Canadian Hot 100 chart. The single has been certified Platinum by both the Recording Industry Association of America (RIAA) and Music Canada.

The accompanying music video for the song was directed by TK McKamy.

Background
"Fix" was written in February 2015 with the intention of co-writer Abe Stoklasa recording it for his own album. However, after the song was pitched to publishers, the newly-formed independent label Big Loud Records' manager-partner Seth England optioned the song for the label's flagship artist Chris Lane. The song was "countrified" for Lane, including lyrical changes such as the censoring of "good shit," though it retained some of the dance music and blue-eyed soul influences of the demo.

The song, released in October 2015, is the first release by Big Loud Records which was formed in the summer of 2015. Chris Lane performed the song at the Grand Ole Opry on February 20, 2016.

Commercial performance
The song debuted on the Country Airplay chart in December 2015 at number 50, then debuted on the Hot Country Songs at number 44 two weeks later. The song reached number one on the Country Airplay chart in August 2016, which is the first number one on the chart for Chris Lane. The song has sold 291,000 copies in the US as of August 2016. It was certified platinum by the Recording Industry Association of America (RIAA) on September 28, 2020.

Music video
A lyric video directed by Lloyd Aur Norman premiered on Lane's Vevo account on October 30, 2015. The official music video was directed by TK McKamy and premiered January 6, 2016.

Charts and certifications

Weekly charts

Year end charts

Certifications

Release history

References 

2015 songs
2015 singles
Chris Lane songs
Songs written by Sarah Buxton
Songs written by Jesse Frasure
Song recordings produced by Joey Moi
Music videos directed by TK McKamy
Big Loud singles